Harold Duane Vietor (December 29, 1931 – July 23, 2016) was a United States district judge of the United States District Court for the Southern District of Iowa.

Education and career

Born in Parkersburg, Iowa in 1931, Vietor was in the United States Navy from 1952 to 1954. He received a Bachelor of Arts degree from the University of Iowa in 1955, and a Juris Doctor from the University of Iowa College of Law in 1958. He served as a law clerk for Judge Martin Donald Van Oosterhout of the United States Court of Appeals for the Eighth Circuit, from 1958 to 1959. He was in private practice in Cedar Rapids, Iowa from 1959 to 1965. In 1965 he was appointed as a judge of the Iowa District Court in Cedar Rapids, where he served until 1979, the last nine years as chief judge of his district.

Federal judicial service

Vietor was nominated by President Jimmy Carter on March 15, 1979, to the United States District Court for the Southern District of Iowa, to a new seat authorized by 92 Stat. 1629. He was confirmed by the United States Senate on May 10, 1979, and received his commission on May 11, 1979. He served as Chief Judge from 1985 to 1992. He assumed senior status on December 29, 1996. His service terminated on July 23, 2016, due to his death in Tucson, Arizona from a stroke. He still heard cases until approximately one year before his death, when he moved to Tucson.

References

Sources
 

1931 births
2016 deaths
Iowa state court judges
Judges of the United States District Court for the Southern District of Iowa
United States district court judges appointed by Jimmy Carter
20th-century American judges
University of Iowa alumni
University of Iowa College of Law alumni
United States Navy sailors
People from Parkersburg, Iowa